Gilmour Academy is an independent, Catholic, coeducational, college-preparatory day and boarding school in the Cleveland suburb of Gates Mills, Ohio, United States. Founded in 1946 by the Brothers of Holy Cross, Gilmour Academy has three divisions, Lower School, Middle School and Upper School. In the Lower School, Gilmour offers a Montessori preschool program for 18 months - PreK. The Lower School also houses the children in kindergarten through Grade 6. Gilmour's Middle School holds 7th and 8th grades, and, as of the 2021-2022 school year, has 65 students. At nearly 500 students, Gilmour's Upper School has grades 9-12 (and also offers a post-grad option). A boarding program is available to students in grades 9–12.

Gilmour Academy is chartered through the state of Ohio and accredited through the Independent School Association of Central States (ISCACS). It is a member of the National Association of Independent Schools (NAIS), the Ohio Association of Independent Schools (OAIS), the Cleveland Council of Independent Schools (CCIS) and the Coalition of Essential Schools (CES).

Campus

Gilmour's  campus has experienced significant growth and expansion in recent years. The Lynn and Michael Kelley Middle School houses a Broadcast Media Center and Digital Media Lab where students can learn and practice with digital media technology. The Lorraine and Bill Dodero Center for Performing Arts was completed in early 2020 and opened with The Broadway Princess Party and Beauty and the Beast, Jr. Also opening its doors in 2020 was the Nature-Based Learning Center, which is home to the giving garden and in close proximity to the "Gilmour Girls" chicken coop and apiary. Our Lady Chapel (which opened in 1994) serves as a venue for liturgical events and student convocation. Gilmour's Athletic Center (which opened in 2009) houses a pool, main gym and a three-court field house and the Floyd E. Stefanski Ice Center houses two NHL-sized ice rinks and a fitness center. New artificial turf was installed in 2020 in a multiple-use field for football, soccer, and lacrosse.

Boarding program

Gilmour maintains a boarding program for students in grades 9–12. It has resident students from the United States and other countries around the world including Canada, Mexico, South Korea, Sweden, Taiwan, China, Spain, and India. The residence program includes supervised study hall, chaperoned activities, and personal advising and mentoring.

Athletics
Gilmour's athletic teams are known as the Lancers. The school competes in the Ohio High School Athletic Association and the North Coast League.

Ohio High School Athletic Association State Championships

 Boys' golf – 1991, 1992, 1993, 1994, 2010
 Boys' ice hockey 2022
 Boys' track and field – 1971
 Girls' track and field – 2005, 2006, 2007*, 2009
 Girls' cross country – 2006
 Girls' volleyball – 2015,  2020, and 2021
 Girls' soccer – 2016
 Girls' basketball – 2017
 * tie

Notable alumni
Gary Cohn, President & COO of Goldman, Sachs; Director of the National Economic Council and chief economic advisor to President Donald Trump; Vice-Chairman of IBM
Matthew J. Dolan, Ohio State Senator 
 Paul Dolan, chairman/CEO of the Cleveland Guardians Major League Baseball organization
 John Gilmour, ice hockey player
 Ray Gricar, former District Attorney of Centre County, Pennsylvania
Naz Hillmon, basketball player
 Douglas Kenney, writer, actor, and producer
 Russell Potter, professor of English at Rhode Island College
 Phoebe Robinson, comedian, actress, podcaster, and author
 Barbara Romer, film producer
 Art Rooney II, president of the Pittsburgh Steelers National Football League organization
 Andy Selfridge, football player
 John W. Snow, 73rd United States Secretary of the Treasury
 Brian Stepanek, film/television actor

References

External links
Gilmour.org

Holy Cross secondary schools
Congregations of Holy Cross
Catholic secondary schools in Ohio
High schools in Cuyahoga County, Ohio
Educational institutions established in 1946
Catholic boarding schools in the United States
Boarding schools in Ohio
Private K-12 schools in Ohio
Private middle schools in Ohio
Private elementary schools in Ohio
1946 establishments in Ohio
Roman Catholic Diocese of Cleveland